The 2000–01 Alpha Ethniki was the 65th season of the highest football league of Greece. The season began on 16 September 2000 and ended on 27 May 2001. Olympiacos won their fifth consecutive and 30th Greek title.

Teams

Stadia and personnel

 1 On final match day of the season, played on 27 May 2001.

League table

Results

Relegation play-off

|}

Top scorers
Source: Galanis Sports Data

External links
Official Greek FA Site
RSSSF
Greek SuperLeague official Site
SuperLeague Statistics
 

Alpha Ethniki seasons
Greece
1